Swimming at the 1st Pan American Games took place February 26-March 7, 1951, in Buenos Aires, Argentina. Preliminary heats were held February 26–28, with final heats being swum on March 2, 4, 6 and 7.

Event schedule

Results

Men's events

Women's events

Medal table

References

 
 
 Folha Online
  .